David L. Holcomb (1848–1913) was a member of the Wisconsin State Assembly.

Biography
Holcomb was born on April 26, 1848, in what is now Greenbush, Wisconsin. He would attend what was then Galesville University. After residing in Floyd, Iowa, Holcomb settled in Arcadia, Wisconsin in 1867. Jobs he held include farm hand and schoolteacher. Holcomb married Ida Dewey in 1874. He died on September 30, 1913, and was interred in Arcadia.

Political career
Holcomb was elected to the Assembly in 1892 and 1898. Additionally, he was President of the school board and Chairman (similar to Mayor) of Arcadia and a member of the county board of Trempealeau County, Wisconsin. He was a Republican.

References

1848 births
1913 deaths
People from Sheboygan County, Wisconsin
People from Floyd County, Iowa
People from Arcadia, Wisconsin
Republican Party members of the Wisconsin State Assembly
Mayors of places in Wisconsin
School board members in Wisconsin
Gale College alumni
Schoolteachers from Wisconsin
Farmworkers